Ta'liq is the Arabic word for suspension.
 Ta'liq (script) is a style of Islamic calligraphy that was developed in Persia. The Nasta'liq script developed from Ta'liq and Naskh (script).
 Ta'liq (torture) is a method of torture where the victim is suspended from a metal bar while being beaten.